Mehdili (Also known by the names of Mekhdili and Mekhtily) is a village and municipality in the Kurdamir Rayon of Azerbaijan. Its Postal Code is AZ 3334.

References 

Populated places in Kurdamir District